Laleka is a town and Union Council of Bahawalnagar District in the Punjab province of Pakistan.

References

Populated places in Bahawalnagar District
Cities and towns in Bahawalnagar District
Populated places in Minchinabad Tehsil
Union councils of Minchinabad Tehsil